Conner Smith (born September 6, 2000) is an American country music singer. He is signed to Big Machine Records' Valory label and has charted two singles. Smith was a member of the Sigma Phi Epsilon Fraternity in college.

Biography
Conner Smith was born and raised in Nashville, Tennessee. His mother, Jennifer Vickery Smith, worked in the country music industry and often interviewed artists, which inspired Smith to start songwriting himself. By age 20, he began writing songs with Nashville songwriters Ashley Gorley and Zach Crowell.

In late 2021, Smith released a song called "I Hate Alabama", which went viral on TikTok. This song's success led to him signing with Big Machine Records' Valory label. Smith released an extended play for the label titled Didn't Go Too Far in 2022. The project's lead single "Learn from It" has made the top 40 on Country Airplay. Crowell produced the EP.

Discography

Extended plays
Didn't Go Too Far (2022)

Singles

References

American country singer-songwriters
Big Machine Records artists
Country musicians from Tennessee
Living people
People from Nashville, Tennessee
2000 births